Franz Hruska (21 November 1888 – 29 April 1977) was a German politician from the Social Democratic Party of Germany. He was a member of the Landtag of North Rhine-Westphalia between 20 April 1947 and 4 July 1954.

References

1888 births
1977 deaths
People from Dobřany
Social Democratic Party of Germany politicians
Members of the Landtag of North Rhine-Westphalia
Sudeten German people